Sulz im Weinviertel is a town in the district of Gänserndorf in the Austrian state of Lower Austria. It is known for its open air museum in Niedersulz, the largest in Lower Austria.

Geography
Sulz lies in the Weinviertel in Lower Austria. Only about 2.26 percent of the municipality is forested.

References

Cities and towns in Gänserndorf District
Open-air museums in Austria